This article contains a list of fossil-bearing stratigraphic units in the state of Wisconsin, U.S.

Sites

See also

 Paleontology in Wisconsin

References

 

Wisconsin
Stratigraphic units
Stratigraphy of Wisconsin
Wisconsin geography-related lists
United States geology-related lists